Venado is a district of the San Carlos canton, in the Alajuela province of Costa Rica.

History 
Venado was created on 14 April 1966 by Decreto Ejecutivo 18. Segregated from Grecia canton.

Geography

Venado has an area of  km² which makes it the seventh district of the canton by area and an elevation of  metres.

Located three kilometers from the head of the district, there are caverns, which are 2000 meters long and are integrated by galleries, rooms, bathrooms, tunnels, windows, vents and chimneys.

In addition to the caves, there are rivers, forests and waterfalls.

It limits the northeast with the districts of Monterrey, the southeast with La Fortuna, the west and southwest with Tilarán and the northwest with the canton of Guatuso.

The direct connection that is offered by bus from the place is to Quesada.

Demographics 

For the 2011 census, Venado had a population of  inhabitants.

Transportation

Road transportation 
The district is covered by the following road routes:
 National Route 4
 National Route 734

Settlements
The 14 population centers of the district are:
La Tigra
Jicarito
Santa Martha
Santa Lucía
Linda Vista
El Cacao
San Isidro
Cantanuario
El Burío
Sangregado
La Esperanza
Venado
Santa Eulalia
Puerto Seco

Economy 

The main productive activity is the cattle raising of milk and meat and its derivatives (like the manufacture of cheeses) together with the production of roots and tubers.

References 

Districts of Alajuela Province
Populated places in Alajuela Province